Jacob Thedoor Cremer (1 April 1902 – 26 August 1979) was a Dutch coxswain. He competed at the 1924 Summer Olympics in Paris with the men's eight where they were eliminated in round one.

References

1902 births
1979 deaths
Dutch male rowers
Olympic rowers of the Netherlands
Rowers at the 1924 Summer Olympics
Sportspeople from Haarlem
Coxswains (rowing)
European Rowing Championships medalists
20th-century Dutch people